Aloysius Pennie (born April 17, 1984) is a Liberian footballer, who plays for Liberia Ship Corporate Registry Football Club as a defender.

International career
Pennie was a member of the Liberia national football team and earned his first cap in May 2005.

Notes 

1984 births
Living people
Liberian footballers
Association football defenders
Liberia international footballers